This is a list of the National Register of Historic Places listings in Hall County, Texas.

This is intended to be a complete list of properties listed on the National Register of Historic Places in Hall County, Texas. There are two properties listed on the National Register in the county. Both properties are Recorded Texas Historic Landmarks including one that is also a State Antiquities Landmark.

Current listings

The locations of National Register properties may be seen in a mapping service provided.

|}

See also

National Register of Historic Places listings in Texas
Recorded Texas Historic Landmarks in Hall County

References

External links

Hall County, Texas
Hall County
Buildings and structures in Hall County, Texas